Taylor-Dunn is a manufacturer of industrial electric vehicles. The company was founded in 1949 and is headquartered in Anaheim, California. The vehicles manufactured there are primarily for transporting people and equipment inside warehouses, factories, and work sites. Outdoor users have included airports, college campuses, resorts, and gated subdivisions.

In 1949 an Anaheim farmer founded the company, having built an electric cart to use while feeding his chickens. Around 1990 the company was purchased by two electronics executives; by 1992 it had $25 million in annual sales, and about 60% of the market for electric utility vehicles.

In 1992 the company expanded to produce full-size trucks, with the Electruck, a larger utility vehicle still targeted for its current customers.

In 2016 Polaris Inc. purchased the company, which at the time had 150 employees. Taylor-Dunn reported that it would retain its brand and headquarters. In 2022, Polaris sold Taylor-Dunn and GEM to a group of former Polaris executives. The group would operate both brands at Taylor-Dunn's headquarters under the name Waev, Inc.

References

External links

 

Companies based in Anaheim, California
Vehicle manufacturing companies established in 1949
Battery electric vehicle manufacturers
Car manufacturers of the United States
Low-speed vehicles
Electric vehicle manufacturers of the United States
Manufacturing companies based in California